L'Herne is a French independent publishing house, known worldwide for its collection Cahiers de L'Herne.

History 

The first issues are devoted to the great names in literature, philosophy and poetry: Jorge Luis Borges, Witold Gombrowicz, Louis Massignon, Céline, Thomas Mann, Fyodor Dostoyevsky, Friedrich Hölderlin, Henry Corbin and Emmanuel Levinas. From 2000, the focus is on philosophers, critics and contemporary novelists such as Sigmund Freud, Albert Camus, Pablo Picasso, Paul Ricoeur, Claude Lévi-Strauss, Carlos Fuentes, Noam Chomsky, Colette, Vargas Llosa, Patrick Modiano, Simone de Beauvoir, Joseph Conrad, Joseph Roth, Michel Houellebecq.

These large critical monographs have profoundly influenced the relationship between criticism and literature. Assembling unpublished documents, recollections, testimonies, iconography, and interpretations, the Cahiers are an invitation to discover great authors by a free approach without theoretical crutches, without partisanship. Indeed, the only guiding logic of an issue is to explode preconceptions and go to the heart of the work. More than four thousand collaborators, writers, academics and translators from all over the world have so far participated, off the beaten track, in creating a one-of-a-kind institution.

Carnets de L'Herne 

Les Carnets de L'Herne open, since 2002, a small eclectic door to great contemporary and classical texts, often unknown and rare. They consist of valuable texts, short and radicals, unpublished or missing, written by major thinkers and writers. From Chomsky to St Augustine through Beauvoir or Françoise Sagan, they open a direct access to the thoughts as well as to the fictions of these authors who have formed the thought and the contemporary and classical literature. They are more than 120 composing the range of this rich and graceful collection.

Essais 

The collection Essais opens its pages to texts of great modern and contemporary thinkers keeping the focus on the editorial line that made his reputation. This collection offers comments and reflections of thinkers of our time as much on current issues as fundamental quests of humanity.

Cave Canem 

Cave Canem provides a forum for dissidents and protesters of all countries who raise, sometimes risking their lives, against the tyranny of states, markets and misconceptions. The first issue, in the writings of the famous chess champion Garry Kasparov, denounced the abuses of the Russian regime led by Vladimir Putin. This number was followed by Noam Chomsky’s book on the Occupy movement and Justice for Palestine! an impassioned plea of the Russell Tribunal on Palestine.

Cahiers d'Anthropologie Sociale 

In partnership with the Collège de France, L'Herne publishes the collection of Cahiers d’Anthropologie Sociale under the patronage of Claude Lévi-Strauss, Philippe Descola and Françoise Héritier. The eleven books from this collection provide the readers all the work done in the Laboratory of Social Anthropology at the Collège de France, and also offer a new vision of the anthropological approach on a few major topical issues.

Romans and Écrits 

Finally, Romans and Écrits gather contemporary and classic, foreign and French writers, with the only constant eclecticism of the substance and the excellence of form. This collection reunites big names such as Walter Benjamin, Marguerite Duras, Elizabeth Gaskell, Anthony Trollope, Colette, Franz Hessel, Jose Maria Arguedas, etc.

Book publishing companies of France